The Call of the Blood (French: L'appel du sang) is a 1920 French silent drama film directed by Louis Mercanton and starring Ivor Novello, Phyllis Neilson-Terry, and Charles Le Bargy. The film is most notable for giving a screen debut to the Welsh actor Novello, who went on to become a major star in the 1920s. It is based on the 1906 novel of the same title by Robert Hichens. The costumes were designed by Paul Poiret.

Synopsis
An Englishman commits adultery with a Sicilian woman.

Cast
 Phyllis Neilson-Terry as Hermione Lester
 Ivor Novello as Maurice Delarey
 Desdemona Mazza  as  Maddalena
 Charles Le Bargy as Émile d'Arbois
 Gabriel de Gravone  as  Gaspare
 Salvatore Lo Turco as Salvatore

See also
Call of the Blood (1948)

References

Bibliography
 Macnab, Geoffrey. Searching for Stars. Cassell, 2000.

External links 
 

1920 films
French drama films
French silent films
1920 drama films
1920s French-language films
Films directed by Louis Mercanton
French black-and-white films
Films based on British novels
Films set in Sicily
Silent drama films
1920s French films